Chase Cobblestone Farmhouse, also known as the Chase-Flack Farmhouse, is a historic home located at the Village of Hilton in Monroe County, New York, United States. It is a vernacular Greek Revival style cobblestone farmhouse built about 1836. It is constructed of rather small sized field cobbles and is one of ten surviving cobblestone buildings in the Town of Parma.

It was listed on the National Register of Historic Places in 1995.

References

Houses on the National Register of Historic Places in New York (state)
Cobblestone architecture
Greek Revival houses in New York (state)
Houses completed in 1836
Houses in Monroe County, New York
National Register of Historic Places in Monroe County, New York